Piotr Daniluk (born 15 January 1982) is a Polish sports shooter. He competed in the men's 10 metre air pistol event at the 2016 Summer Olympics.

References

External links
 

1982 births
Living people
Polish male sport shooters
Olympic shooters of Poland
Shooters at the 2016 Summer Olympics
Sportspeople from Gdynia
European Games competitors for Poland
Shooters at the 2015 European Games
Shooters at the 2019 European Games
21st-century Polish people